Kajal Raghwani is an Indian actress. She has worked in Bhojpuri films like Pratigya 2, Hukumat,Patna Se Pakistan, Muqaddar, Mehandi Laga Ke Rakhna and Mai Sehra Bandh Ke Aaunga. She made her debut in Bhojpuri in the year 2011 through the Bhojpuri film Sugna 

She received the Bhojpuri Best Actress People's Choice Award in 2016 at the International Bhojpuri Film Awards (IBFA) held in Dubai.

Filmography

See also
 List of Bhojpuri cinema actresses

References

External links
 

Actresses in Bhojpuri cinema
21st-century Indian actresses
Indian film actresses
Living people
1990 births